Here are all types of bridges.



Natural occurring bridges

See also
 Cable-stayed suspension bridge

References

Types